Pshikuykhabl is a rural locality (an aul) in Ponezhukhayskoye Rural Settlement of Teuchezhsky District, the Republic of Adygea, Russia. The population was 275 as of 2018. There are 6 streets.

Geography 
The aul is located on the shore of the Krasnodar Reservoir of the Kuban River, 7 km north of Ponezhukay (the district's administrative centre) by road. Nacherezy is the nearest rural locality.

Ethnicity 
The aul is inhabited by Adyghes.

References 

Rural localities in Teuchezhsky District